Nawan Shehr Janubi is a union council and town of Abbottabad District in Khyber-Pakhtunkhwa province of Pakistan. According to the 2017 Census of Pakistan, the population is 7,951.

References

Union councils of Abbottabad District